Dalata Hotel Group PLC is a hotel company which owns and operates hotels across Ireland and the UK. It is the largest hotel operator in Ireland with 7,101 rooms available across owned, leased and managed hotels. As of February 2020, the company operates 32 hotels across Ireland (25 owned, 7 leased) as well as managing 3 on behalf of external parties. Additionally, it operates 9 hotels across the UK (5 owned, 4 leased).

History
Dalata Hotel Group PLC was founded in July 2007 by Pat McCann, former chief executive of the Jurys Doyle Hotel Group.

The company made its initial public offering in 2014.

Hotels

The majority of Dalata hotels are operated under their Maldron or Clayton brands, for 3-star and 4-star properties respectively. The Clayton name comes from an originally independent hotel acquired in Galway in 2014.

A significant single expansion for the group was the purchase of nine of the ten hotels of the Moran Bewleys Hotel Group in 2014. These were subsequently rebranded to the Maldron or Clayton brands.

Properties operated under the Clayton Hotels brand include the Clayton Hotel, Limerick (one of the tallest hotels in Ireland), and the Clayton Burlington Hotel, Dublin (formerly the Burlington, and now owned by a German real estate group). In Cork, the Clayton Hotel Cork City (formerly the Clarion Hotel), was acquired by the group in 2016.

See also

 The Doyle Collection
 Jurys Inn

References

External links
 

2014 initial public offerings
Companies based in Dublin (city)
Companies listed on Euronext Dublin
Companies listed on the London Stock Exchange
Irish brands
Hospitality companies established in 2007
Irish companies established in 2007
Hotel chains
Hospitality companies of Ireland